Xenosoma is a genus of moths in the subfamily Arctiinae. The genus was described by Felder in 1874.

Species
Xenosoma bryki Hering, 1943 Colombia
Xenosoma dubia (Warren, 1900) Ecuador
Xenosoma flaviceps (Walker, 1865) Mexico, Guatemala
Xenosoma flavisedes Dognin, 1891 Venezuela
Xenosoma geometrina (Schaus, 1910) Costa Rica
Xenosoma nicander H. Druce, 1886 Costa Rica, Panama
Xenosoma nigromarginatum H. Druce, 1886 Costa Rica
Xenosoma oratesina (Dognin, 1916) Peru, Bolivia

References

Arctiinae